Coumantaros is a Greek surname. Notable people with the surname include:

George S. Coumantaros (1922–2016), Greek businessman and yachtsman
Ioannis Coumantaros (1894-1981), Greek businessman
John Coumantaros (born 1961), Greek-American businessman

Greek-language surnames